Camila Rodrigues Rebelo (born 3 February 2003) is a Portuguese swimmer.

References 

2003 births
Living people
Mediterranean Games medalists in swimming
Swimmers at the 2022 Mediterranean Games
Mediterranean Games gold medalists for Portugal
Swimmers at the 2020 Summer Olympics
Sportspeople from Coimbra District
21st-century Portuguese women